Grenique Roshawn Harper (born November 13), simply known as Grenique is an American R&B soul singer.

Early life
Her mother was a poet and her dad was a singer. Her parents gave her the name "Grenique" because her dad name was Greg and her mom thought she would be unique. She grew up listening to Chaka Khan, Cameo, Average White Band, Minnie Riperton, Phyllis Hyman, Sarah Vaughan and Ella Fitzgerald.

Career
In 1998 her song "Disco" which is on her debut album appeared on the Rush Hour movie soundtrack. Two weeks before her 22nd birthday Kedar Massenberg the president of Motown alongside Chico DeBarge signed her to Motown. She released her debut album entitled "Black Butterfly" the lead single was Should I, The album failed to sell well, only making it at 49 on the Billboard Top R&B Hip-Hop Chart and 17 on the Heatseekers album chart as well. She gave background vocals on Alyson Williams album "It's About Time" and later on in 2008 Grenique co-written The Game song "Game's Pain".

Discography

Studio albums

References

1975 births
Living people
People from Landover, Maryland
People from Prince George's County, Maryland
20th-century African-American women singers
African-American women singer-songwriters
American rhythm and blues singer-songwriters
American contemporary R&B singers
Singer-songwriters from Maryland
Motown artists
21st-century African-American women singers